Bartłomiej Kalinkowski (born 11 July 1994) is a Polish professional footballer who plays as a midfielder for Polish club Chojniczanka Chojnice. He started his senior career with Legia Warsaw.

Honours
Górnik Łęczna
II liga: 2019–20

References

External links

1994 births
Footballers from Warsaw
Living people
Polish footballers
Poland youth international footballers
Association football midfielders
Legia Warsaw players
Legia Warsaw II players
Wigry Suwałki players
GKS Katowice players
ŁKS Łódź players
Górnik Łęczna players
Chojniczanka Chojnice players
Ekstraklasa players
I liga players
II liga players
III liga players